Luis Enrique Fernández Figueroa (born May 22, 1951) is a Mexican former footballer, who played most of his career with Puebla F.C.

Club career
He began his career with them in the mid-1970s, when the club had been promoted from the Segunda División. In the 1970s, he was a key player with Puebla's promotion and avoiding various relegation tournaments. In 1978 he transferred to Atlante F.C., where he played until 1981. In 1982, he returned to Puebla, where in 1982 he helped the club win its first Primera División Profesional against Chivas in a memorable penalty shootout where he scored the final goal to clinch the title. He played one more year with the club and then retired, but returned in 1992 to play one more year for Club Universidad de Guadalajara.

Achievements
Primera División Mexicana 1982-83

External links
 mediotiempo.com

1951 births
Living people
Association football defenders
Mexican footballers
Club Puebla players
Atlante F.C. footballers
Leones Negros UdeG footballers